Negureni is a commune in Telenești District, Moldova. It is composed of three villages: Chersac, Dobrușa and Negureni.

References

Communes of Telenești District